The Groupie Doll Stakes (known as the 'Gardenia Stakes / Gardenia Handicap' until 2015) is an American Thoroughbred horse race held annually in early August at Ellis Park Race Course in Henderson, Kentucky. The event is open to three-year-olds & up fillies and mares. It is run at one mile (8 furlongs) on a conventional dirt surface. The race itself was initially named for the flower used in the winner's garland.  The race is now named after the 2011 winner; Groupie Doll.

The race was first run in 1982. It first became a Grade III race in 1988.

Records
Speed record
 1 mile – 1:34.97 – Devious Intent (2013)
  miles – 1:47.60 – Lt. Lao (1988)

Most wins by a trainer
 4 – Dale Romans (2002, 2004, 2008, 2014)

Most wins by a Jockey
 3 – Larry Melancon (1990, 2007, 2009)
 2 – Mark Guidry (2001, 2004)

Winners

See also
 Groupie Doll Stakes top three finishers

References

Ellis Park Race Course
1982 establishments in Kentucky
Horse races in Kentucky
Graded stakes races in the United States
Recurring sporting events established in 1982